Rhododendron hanceanum is a species of flowering plant in the genus Rhododendron native to south-central China. Its Nanum Group has gained the Royal Horticultural Society's Award of Garden Merit.

References

hanceanum
Endemic flora of China
Plants described in 1889